Vologda State Technical University is the largest technical university of Vologda Oblast in Russia.

History
The history of the University began in 1966, when the General engineering faculty of the North-Western Extramural Polytechnic Institute (NWPI) was founded in Vologda. There was only evening and extramural training at the faculty. In 1967 the faculty was reorganized into the Vologda Branch of the NWPI. There were only 2 faculties:
 Internal faculty
 Evening and Extramural faculty
In 1975 the Vologda Oblast executive committee offered to reorganize the Vologda Branch of the NWPI into the Vologda Polytechnic Institute (VPI). In 1999 the VPI was given the highest accreditive rank of the university. Since then it is called the Vologda State Technical University (VSTU).

Faculties

Power engineering faculty
The power engineering faculty (PEF) was founded in 1971 and alongside the Faculty of industrial management it is one of the oldest faculties. It consists of the following departments:
 Power Supply
 Information Systems in Management
 Electric Equipment
 Bio-Medical Engineering
 Automation and Computer Science
 Information Systems and Technology
At present the power engineering faculty prepares students for the following specialties:
 Power supply
 Electric drive and automation of industrial installations and technological complexes
 Control and information science in technical systems
 Information systems and technologies
 Computing machinery, complexes, systems and network
 Software of computing machinery and automation systems
 Engineering in medical and biological practice
and the following training programs:
 Power engineering
 Electrical engineering, electromechanics   and electrical technology
 Automation and control
 Information science and computer engineering.

Industrial management faculty 
The Industrial management faculty (IMF) got its name in 1997, before that it was called the mechanics-technological faculty. Along with the power engineering faculty it is the oldest faculty of the Vologda State Technical University. It includes the following departments:
 department of technology of mechanical engineering
 department of technology and equipment of the automated manufactures
 department of automobiles
 department of economy and technology of production
 department of theory and design of machines and mechanisms
 department of safety of life and industrial ecology.
Now FIM prepares students in 4 specialities:
 "Mechanical engineering technology" with specialisation "Technology, industrial management and marketing in machinery engineering"
 "Automation of technological processes and Industries" with specialisation "Systems of the automated designing"
 "Automobiles and automobile industry"
 "Economy and management of an enterprise" in the branch of "Science and scientific service" with specialization "Innovation management"
and 2 training programs:
 Technological machinery and equipment
 Innovation management
Besides at the faculty there are additional programs of the higher professional education provided with an extra fee:
 the second higher economic education;
 the parallel higher economic education;
 the reduced engineering and economic programs

Construction engineering faculty
The Construction Engineering Faculty (CEF), founded in 1972, is one of the oldest faculties. It consists of the following departments:
 Architecture and city construction
 Industrial and civil construction
 Gas and heat supply and ventilation
 Highway construction
 City cadastre and geodesy
 Descriptive geometry and graphics
 Strength of materials
The Construction Engineering Faculty prepares students for the following specialties:
 Architecture
 Design of architectural environment
 Industrial and civil construction
 Towns utility services
 Heat and Gas supply and ventilation
 Highway and airfield construction
 Industrial heat energy
and the training program "Construction engineering".

Faculty of ecology
The faculty of ecology received its name in 2000. In 1977-2000 its name was hydraulic. It comprises the following departments:
 department of water supply and drainage.
 department of geoecology and engineering geology.
 department of urban cadastre and geodesy.
 department of complex use and protection of natural resources.
 department of chemistry.
Now the faculty trains students in the following specialties:
 Geoecology
 Urban cadastre
 Water supply and sewerage system
 Rescue in emergency situations
 Nature management
 Multiple use and protection of water resources
 Environmental territory planning

Faculty of economics
The faculty of economics was created in 1994. It is one of the youngest faculties of the VSTU.The faculty consists of the following departments:
 Economics and management
 Management
 Finance and credit
 Accounting and auditing
 Economics and mathematical modeling
 Economic theory and national economy

Faculty of Economics prepares students for the following specialties:
 National economy
 Finance and credit
 Accounting, analysis and audit"
 Economics and management (mechanical engineering)
 Economics and management (construction engineering)
 State and municipal management
 Management of an organization

Faculty of humanities
The faculty of humanities is the youngest in the university, it appeared in September 2000. It consists of the following departments:
 department of social and humanitarian sciences
 department of social-cultural service and tourism
 department of foreign languages
 department of physical education
 department of philosophy and law
 department of linguistics and intercultural communication
Now the faculty of humanities offers courses in four specialties:
 Management organization (specialization "Social Technologies")
 Social and cultural service and tourism (specialization "Social and cultural service")
 Translation and translation studies (specialization "Translation and interpreting")
 Theory and practice of intercultural communication

Faculty of correspondence and distance studying
The Faculty of correspondence and distance studying (FCDS) was founded in 1973 and until 2002 it was known as the faculty of evening and distance studying. Now it combines correspondence and evening branches of the university. The faculty provides studying in 13 specialties:
 Electricity
 Electrical and power engineering of businesses, organizations and institutions
 Management and informatics in technical systems
 Technology of mechanical engineering with specialization of industrial management and marketing in engineering
 Automobiles and automobile industry
 Industrial and civil construction
 Water supply and sewerage (specialization: the protection of the hydrosphere and aquatic ecology)
 Finance and credit
 Economics and management in engineering
 Economics and management in construction
 Accounting, analysis and audit
 State and municipal management
 Management of organizations

Intermediate faculty
The intermediate faculty of VSTU was created on the basis of Vologda branch of the S.A. Zverev Leningrad Physical-Mechanical Engineering College, which was opened in Vologda in August 1979. In 1989 the college was connected with the Vologda Polytechnic Institute (VPI).Since 1990 the college was transformed into the intermediate faculty of VPI (from 1999 - VSTU). The faculty implements programs of secondary vocational education in the following specialties:
 Economics and accounting (graduate's qualification - accountant)
 Insurance business (graduate's qualification - specialist of insurance business).
 Computers, complexes, systems and networks (graduate's qualification technician).

Machinery technical school
In 2008 the Vologda Machinery Technical School joined to the Vologda State Technical University. It was an independent educational institution of the secondary professional education before that. The technical school was established in 1967 to prepare specialists for the Bearing Plant. Now the technical school prepares students in the following specialities:
 Economy and book-keeping
 Commerce
 Technology of mechanical engineering
 Installation and technical operation of the industrial equipment
 Technical service and automobile repair
 Automated systems of management and processing the data

Symbolics
The symbol of the Vologda State Technical University is Alkonost. It is a mythical maiden-bird, who is the patron of scientists and knowledge. In her hands there are education and prosperity symbols - a retinue and a flower. Alkonost sits on silver clouds which is an accessory symbol of  Vologda (in Russia only the arms of Vologda has an image of clouds).

External links
 Official site of the Vologda State Technical University 
 List of programs and specialities in the Vologda State Technical University (2008)
 Official sites of some faculties:
 Industrial management faculty 
 Power engineering faculty 
 Construction engineering faculty 
 Faculty of ecology 
 Faculty of economics 
 Faculty of the humanities 
 Faculty of correspondence and distance studying 
 Machinery technical school 
 Official website of Vologda Oblast Government: Vologda State Technical University
 

Universities in Vologda Oblast
Educational institutions established in 1975
Vologda
Technical universities and colleges in Russia